The canton of Senlis is an administrative division of the Oise department, northern France. Its borders were modified at the French canton reorganisation which came into effect in March 2015. Its seat is in Senlis.

It consists of the following communes:
 
Aumont-en-Halatte
Avilly-Saint-Léonard
Chamant
La Chapelle-en-Serval
Courteuil
Fleurines
Mont-l'Évêque
Mortefontaine
Orry-la-Ville
Plailly
Pontarmé
Senlis
Thiers-sur-Thève
Vineuil-Saint-Firmin

References

Cantons of Oise